Frederik De Waele (16 June 1919 – 20 August 2001) was a Belgian gymnast. He competed in seven events at the 1952 Summer Olympics.

References

External links
 

1919 births
2001 deaths
Belgian male artistic gymnasts
Olympic gymnasts of Belgium
Gymnasts at the 1952 Summer Olympics
People from Zele
Sportspeople from East Flanders